Depala Vas is a settlement in the Municipality  of Domžale in the Upper Carniola region of Slovenia.

Name
Depala Vas was first mentioned in 1309 under the German name Diepoltsdorf (and in 1539 under the Slovene name ex Depolia vas). The Slovene name Depala vas is derived from the Slavic personal name Depal (probably of German origin, derived from Dietpald or a similar name). The name therefore literally means 'Depal's village' and likely refers to an early inhabitant of the place. In the past the German name was Depelsdorf.

References

External links 

Depala Vas on Geopedia

Populated places in the Municipality of Domžale